The 2016–17 Úrvalsdeild kvenna was the 60th season of the Úrvalsdeild kvenna, the top tier women's basketball league on Iceland. The season started on October 5, 2016 and ended on April 24, 2017. Keflavík won its sixteenth title by defeating defending champions Snæfell 3–1 in the Finals.

Competition format
The participating teams first played a conventional round-robin schedule with every team playing each opponent twice "home" and twice "away" for a total of 28 games. The top four teams qualified for the championship playoffs whilst the bottom team was relegated to Division 1.

Regular season

Playoffs

References

External links
Official Icelandic Basketball Federation website
2016-2017 Úrvalsdeild statistics

Icelandic
Lea
Úrvalsdeild kvenna seasons (basketball)